Luca Santonocito (born 11 February 1991) is an Italian professional footballer who plays for  club Seregno. Besides Italy, he has played in Scotland.

Honours

Club 
 Monza
Serie D: 2016-17
Scudetto Dilettanti: 2016-17

References

External links
 
  at usdcaravaggio.it
  at caronnese.com
  at ilgiorno.it

1991 births
Footballers from Lombardy
People from Brianza
Living people
Italian footballers
Association football midfielders
A.C. Milan players
F.C. Südtirol players
Celtic F.C. players
Inter Milan players
Milano City F.C. players
A.S.D. Fanfulla players
A.C. Monza players
U.S. 1913 Seregno Calcio players
Serie D players
Italian expatriate footballers
Expatriate footballers in Scotland
Italian expatriate sportspeople in Scotland